Sunapee may refer to:

Sunapee, New Hampshire, a town in the United States
Lake Sunapee, the lake on which the town is situated
Mount Sunapee, the mountain nearby
Mount Sunapee Resort, ski area on the mountain